The 2012–13 Arkansas–Pine Bluff Golden Lions men's basketball team represented the University of Arkansas at Pine Bluff during the 2012–13 NCAA Division I men's basketball season. The Golden Lions, led by fifth year head coach George Ivory, played their home games at the K. L. Johnson Complex and were members of the Southwestern Athletic Conference. Due to low APR scores, the Golden Lions were ineligible for post season play, including the SWAC Tournament. They finished the season 16–14, 15–3 in SWAC play to finish in a tie for second place with Southern.

Roster

Schedule

|-
!colspan=9| Regular Season

References

Arkansas–Pine Bluff Golden Lions men's basketball seasons
Arkansas-Pine Bluff
Arkansas-Pine Bluff Golden Lions men's basketball
Arkansas-Pine Bluff Golden Lions men's basketball